The Canyon Courier is a weekly newspaper (published on Wednesdays) by Evergreen Newspapers. The newspaper primarily serves the community of Evergreen, Colorado, 30 miles west of Denver, Colorado. 
The Courier was featured in the 1999 movie Double Jeopardy.

The Courier began in 1955 as Smoke Signals, a monthly bulletin published by the Indian Hills Fire Department. The paper was purchased in 1958 to begin weekly publication as the Canyon Courier.

In May 2021, The Colorado Sun and nonprofit organization The National Trust for Local News became joint owners of The Canyon Courier along with over a dozen more local newspapers.

References

External links
Canyon Courier

Newspapers published in Colorado
Weekly newspapers published in the United States
Jefferson County, Colorado